Heterachthes polingi is a species of beetle in the family Cerambycidae. It was described by Fall in 1925.

References

Heterachthes
Beetles described in 1925